The  was an army of the Imperial Japanese Army based in Manchukuo from the Russo-Japanese War until the end of World War II.

History

Russo-Japanese War
The Japanese 4th Army was initially raised on June 24, 1904 in the midst of the Russo-Japanese War under the command of General Nozu Michitsura out of various reserve elements, to provide support and additional manpower in the Japanese drive towards Mukden in the closing stages of the war against Imperial Russia. It was disbanded at Mukden on January 17, 1906 after the signing of the Treaty of Portsmouth and the end of the war.

Second Sino-Japanese War
After the start of the Second Sino-Japanese War, the Japanese Fourth Army was raised again as a garrison force to guard the northern borders of Manchukuo against possible incursions by the Soviet Red Army. It was based at Bei'an, the capital of a northern Manchukuo province of the same name, that was heavily fortified with various ground emplacements. The Fourth Army afterwards came under the operational command of the Japanese First Area Army under the overall command of the Kwantung Army. As the war situation in the southeast Asia and China fronts of World War II worsened against the Japanese, experienced men and equipment were siphoned off from the Fourth Army to reinforce other units, leaving it largely hollowed out by the start of 1945.

During the Soviet invasion of Manchuria in the final days of World War II, the Japanese Fourth Army was absolutely no match for the experienced, battle-hardened Soviet armored and mechanized infantry divisions, who quickly overran or circumvented the Japanese defenses, and its poorly equipped and poorly trained forces were driven back to Harbin by the time of the surrender of Japan. Many of its surviving troops became Japanese POWs in the Soviet Union.

List of Commanders

Commanding officer

Chief of Staff

References

External links

04
Military units and formations established in 1904
Military units and formations disestablished in 1945